Siah Moghan or Seyah Moghan or Siah Maghan() may refer to:
 Siah Moghan-e Bala
 Siah Moghan-e Pain